Shapouri House or Shapouri Pavilion and Garden (Persian:خانه شاپوری) is an early 20th-century Iranian building and garden in the city of Shiraz, Iran.

It has 840 square metres of underpinning and 4635 square metres of garden area, and it is built on two floors. This building is in the old central region of Shiraz, known as Anvari.
This mansion was registered as a national building in 2000 with registration number 2781. Shapouri mansion was designed by Abolghasem Mohandesi and built between 1930 and 1935; the owner was Abdolsaheb Shapuori, a wealthy Iranian merchant. This building is unique and very innovative.

The historical house of Shapouri belongs to the early Pahlavi dynasty in Persia (Iran), c. 1925. This nice house is located in city centre (Anvari Street) of Shiraz and is recorded as an Iranian national monument.

References

Buildings and structures in Shiraz
Houses in Iran